Hugh Algernon Percy, 10th Duke of Northumberland  (6 April 1914 – 11 October 1988), styled Lord Hugh Percy between 1918 and 1940, was a British landowner, soldier and peer. He was the son of Alan Percy, 8th Duke of Northumberland, and Lady Helen Gordon-Lennox. He succeeded to the dukedom of Northumberland in 1940 when his brother, the 9th Duke, was killed in action in World War II.

He served in the Northumberland Hussars and the Royal Regiment of Artillery during World War II, rising to the rank of Captain. After the war, he served as a Conservative whip in the Churchill caretaker ministry. Later, he served as Lord Steward of Queen Elizabeth II's Household from 1973 until his death, Lord Lieutenant of Northumberland from 1956 until 1984 and as the first Chancellor of the University of Newcastle upon Tyne from its formation in 1963 until his death.

Early life and family
Hugh Algernon Percy was born on 6 April 1914. He was the second son of Alan, Earl Percy, later the 8th Duke of Northumberland, and his wife, Lady Helen Gordon-Lennox, herself the daughter of the 7th Duke of Richmond. From birth, as the younger son of an earl, he was entitled to the prefix The Honourable by courtesy. When his father acceded to the dukedom upon the death of his paternal grandfather, the 7th Duke, in 1918, he became known as Lord Hugh Percy. His siblings included: George, 9th Duke of Northumberland; Elizabeth, Duchess of Hamilton; Diana, Duchess of Sutherland; and Lord Richard Percy.

He was educated at Eton College and Christ Church, Oxford.

Career
On 15 April 1936, he was commissioned as a Second Lieutenant in the Northumberland Hussars. He became 10th Duke of Northumberland on 21 May 1940 when his childless elder brother was killed in action in Flanders, Belgium, in the leadup to the Battle of Dunkirk. In 1940, as a Lieutenant, he transferred to the Royal Regiment of Artillery. He served in Crete and on the North African campaign. In 1947, as a Captain, he transferred back to the Northumberland Hussars.

Following the death of his brother, he took his seat in the House of Lords as a Conservative Lord Temporal, making his maiden speech on 29 November 1944 in reply to King George VI's Speech from the Throne. He also took of management of the family estates, namely Alnwick Castle in Northumberland, Albury Park in Surrey and Syon House in London. He also succeeded his brother as Master of the Percy Foxhounds.

On 1 June 1945, he was appointed Lord in Waiting to King George VI, remaining in the position until 23 October 1945. As Lord in Waiting, he was a junior government whip in the Churchill caretaker ministry.

In 1957, he gained the additional peerage of Baron Percy upon the death of his kinsman, James, 9th Duke of Atholl.

In 1963, when the University of Newcastle upon Tyne became independent from the University of Durham, Northumberland was appointed their first Chancellor and retained the post until his death. As chancellor, the Duke presented an honorary degree to the Martin Luther King Jr. in November 1967, five months before Dr King's assassination. He donated many books and works of art to the university's library.

He was appointed Lord Lieutenant of Northumberland on 18 May 1956, a position previously held by his father and many of his ancestors which he held until 1984. On 2 January 1973, Northumberland succeeded the 10th Viscount Cobham as Lord Steward of the Household of Queen Elizabeth II, the most senior of the Great Offices of the Royal Households of the United Kingdom.

In 1970, he was elected a fellow of the Royal Society. On 9 March 1973, he was appointed a member of the Royal Commission on Historical Manuscripts. He chaired or was a member of a number of councils and committees such as the Agricultural Research Council, Medical Research Council and the Committee of Enquiry on Foot and Mouth Disease. He was president of the Royal Agricultural Society of England in 1956 and 1962.

He held the position of Honorary Colonel in various battalions of the Royal Northumberland Fusiliers, Northumbrian Volunteers and the Royal Regiment of Fusiliers.

In recognition of his service, on 24 April 1959, he was appointed the 922nd Knight Companion of the Order of the Garter and made a Knight Grand Cross of the Royal Victorian Order in the 1981 Birthday Honours.

Marriage and issue
On 12 June 1946, he married Lady Elizabeth Diana Montagu Douglas Scott, daughter of the 8th Duke of Buccleuch, at Westminster Abbey. The Duke rode on horseback from Alnwick to Drumlanrig Castle to propose to Lady Elizabeth. The marriage united the Percy and Douglas families who had feuded for centuries, including at the Battle of Otterburn in 1388. Guests at the wedding included King George VI and Queen Elizabeth, Queen Mary, King George II of Greece, Princess Elizabeth and Princess Margaret.

They had seven children: 
 Lady Caroline Mary Percy (born 3 May 1947). She married Pierre, Comte de Cabarrus, on 12 January 1974 and had issue.
 Lady Victoria Lucy Diana Percy (born 19 April 1949). She married, firstly, Aidan Cuthbert on 4 October 1975 and had issue including Lucy, wife of Prince Khalid bin Bandar Al Saud. They were divorced in 2000 and she married secondly, the same year, Charles Lyon Fellowes, whom she divorced in 2006.
 Lady Julia Helen Percy (born 12 November 1950). She married Nicholas Craig Harvey on 11 June 1983 and had issue.
 Henry Alan Walter Richard Percy, 11th Duke of Northumberland (1 July 1953 – 31 October 1995). Godson of Queen Elizabeth II. He succeeded his father as 11th Duke of Northumberland in 1988. 
 Ralph George Algernon Percy, 12th Duke of Northumberland (born 16 November 1956). He married Jane Richard on 21 July 1979 and had issue, including Lady Catherine Percy, George, Earl Percy, and Lady Melissa Trafelet. Succeeded his brother as 12th Duke of Northumberland in 1995.
 Lady Louise Percy (25 May 1962 – 27 May 1962). Died in infancy.
 Lord James William Eustace Percy (born 18 June 1965). He married Lucy Caroline Rugge-Price in 2000 and had issue.

Death
The Duke died of a heart attack at his London home, Syon House, on 11 October 1988 at the age of 74. He was succeeded as duke by his eldest son, Henry, Earl Percy, who became the 11th Duke of Northumberland. He was succeeded as Lord Steward and Chancellor of Newcastle University by the 4th Viscount Ridley, who had succeeded him as Lord Lieutenant of Northumberland four years earlier. His ashes were interred on 18 November 1988 in the Northumberland Vault at Westminster Abbey.

Honours

  24 April 1959: 922nd Knight Companion of the Most Noble Order of the Garter (KG)
  13 June 1981: Knight Grand Cross of the Royal Victorian Order (GCVO)
  9 July 1957: Knight of the Most Venerable Order of the Hospital of St John of Jerusalem (KStJ)
  17 November 1961: Recipient of the Territorial Decoration (TD)

Appointments 
 1970: Fellow of the Royal Society of London for Improving Natural Knowledge (FRS)
 1973: Member of Her Majesty's Most Honourable Privy Council (PC)
 Honorary Associate of the Royal College of Veterinary Surgeons

Military ranks
  15 April 1936: Second Lieutenant, Northumberland Hussars
  1940: Lieutenant, Royal Regiment of Artillery
  20 June 1944: Captain, Royal Regiment of Artillery
  28 August 1947: Captain, Northumberland Hussars

Honorary military appointments
  25 September 1948 – 23 April 1968: Honorary Colonel of the Royal Northumberland Fusiliers
  1 April 1967 – 1 April 1969: Honorary Colonel of the 7th (Territorial) Battalion, Royal Northumberland Fusiliers
  1 April 1969 – 31 March 1971: Honorary Colonel of the 7th Battalion, Royal Northumberland Fusiliers
  1 April 1971 – 31 March 1975: Deputy Honorary Colonel of the Northumbrian Volunteers
  1 April 1975 – 11 October 1988: Honorary Colonel of the 6th (Volunteer) Battalion, Royal Regiment of Fusiliers

References

External links

 Alnwick Castle official website

|-

1914 births
1988 deaths
Hugh Percy, 10th Duke of Northumberland
310
British Army personnel of World War II
Northumberland Hussars officers
Royal Artillery officers
Lord-Lieutenants of Northumberland
Ministers in the Churchill caretaker government, 1945
Conservative Party (UK) Baronesses- and Lords-in-Waiting
Knights of the Garter
Knights Grand Cross of the Royal Victorian Order
Knights of the Order of St John
Members of the Privy Council of the United Kingdom
English justices of the peace
Fellows of the Royal Society (Statute 12)
People educated at Eton College
Alumni of Christ Church, Oxford
People associated with Newcastle University
21st-century British landowners
Burials at Westminster Abbey